The 2019 World Rugby Nations Cup was the fourteenth edition of the World Rugby Nations Cup rugby union tournament, created by World Rugby. 

Like in 2018, the tournament featured 4 teams. Argentina XV and Uruguay remained from the previous year, with Namibia and Russia returning to the competition after not participating in 2018.

Hosts Uruguay won the tournament for the third year in a row, having triumphed in 2017 and 2018.

As of 2022 this is the most recent edition of the World Rugby Nations Cup to take place.

Teams 
Below are the competing teams with their World Rugby Rankings as of the first tournament date (4 June 2019):

 Argentina XV (n/a)
 Namibia (23)
 Russia (20)
 Uruguay (16)

Standings

Results

Round 1

Round 2

Round 3

References

World Rugby Nations Cup
2019 rugby union tournaments for national teams
International rugby union competitions hosted by Uruguay
2019 in Russian rugby union
2019 in Argentine rugby union
rugby union
rugby union
Sports competitions in Montevideo
World Rugby Nations Cup